Megachile nidulator is a species of bee in the family Megachilidae. It was described by Smith in 1864.

References

Nidulator
Insects described in 1864